Ján, also credited as Janko Lehotský (born 16 April 1947) is a Slovak composer and former leader of the Modus band.

Lehotský began his performing career when he was four years old, when he performed in a marionette theater. He was a freelance composer during the Velvet Revolution. In 1974 he began managing the band Modus, in which performed also Marika Gombitová and Miroslav Žbirka. He created about 20 records in his career. His music has drawn similarities to Kenny G and he tries to make music that makes people feel good.

Discography
Solo
1992: Janko Lehotský a priatelia, OPUS
1996: Čiernobiely svet, OPUS
2000: Poslední a prví, Universal
2002: Láv sa píše "Love", Universal
2003: Balíček tónov – Volume 1 (Instrumental), Millenium
2005: Nahé dotyky, Johnny
2007: Najkrajšie piesne, OPUS
2007: Janko Lehotský a priatelia, 2CD, OPUS
2008: Balady: Stalo sa nestalo, OPUS
2010: Sám, Robert Pospiš & Martin Sillay

References
General

Specific

External links

1947 births
Living people
Musicians from Bratislava
Slovak composers
Male composers
Modus (band) members
Slovak male musicians